Persicula persicula, common name : the spotted marginella, is a species of very small sea snail, a marine gastropod mollusk or micromollusk in the family Cystiscidae.

Description
The shell size varies between 13 mm and 25 mm

Distribution
This species occurs in the Atlantic Ocean off Cape Verde, Mauritania and Liberia.

References

 Rolán E., 2005. Malacological Fauna From The Cape Verde Archipelago. Part 1, Polyplacophora and Gastropoda
 Boyer F. (2015). Révision des marginelles de Linné (Mollusques prosobranches : Marginellidae et Cystiscidae). Xenophora Taxonomy. 8: 33-55

External links
  Linnaeus, C. (1758). Systema Naturae per regna tria naturae, secundum classes, ordines, genera, species, cum characteribus, differentiis, synonymis, locis. Editio decima, reformata
  Link, D.H.F. (1807-1808). Beschreibung der Naturalien-Sammlung der Universität zu Rostock. Adlers Erben. 
 Schumacher, C. F. (1817). Essai d'un nouveau système des habitations des vers testacés. Schultz, Copenghagen. iv + 288 pp., 22 pls.
 

Cystiscidae
Molluscs of the Atlantic Ocean
Invertebrates of West Africa
Gastropods of Cape Verde
Gastropods described in 1758
Taxa named by Carl Linnaeus